Joe Clough (10 November 1885 – 27 December 1976) was a taxi and bus driver.

Clough was the first Black bus driver in London. In 2021, a play written by Neil Gore about Clough's life debuted at The Place Theatre in Bedford.

Biography 
Joseph Alan Clough was born on 10 November 1885 in Kingston, Jamaica.

Clough died on 27 December 1976 at Bedford Hospital.

References 

1885 births
1976 deaths
People from Kingston, Jamaica
Bus drivers
Taxi drivers
Migrants from British Jamaica to the United Kingdom